The Labiche Formation is a stratigraphical unit of late Albian to Santonian age in the Western Canadian Sedimentary Basin. 

It takes the name from La Biche River, a tributary of the Athabasca River, and was first described in outcrop in the Athabasca River valley by R.G. McConnell in 1892.

Lithology
The Labiche Formation is composed shale with flakes of coccolithic debris, Inoceramus prisms, pyrite.

Distribution

Relationship to other units
The Labiche Formation is overlain by the Belly River Formation and conformably overlays the Pelican Formation.

It is equivalent to the parts of the Colorado Group in central Alberta and to the sum of Smoky Group, Dunvegan Formation and Shaftesbury Formation in north-western Alberta.

References

Stratigraphy of Alberta